Pietro Boselli (born 3 December 1988) is an Italian model, engineer, and former mathematics lecturer at University College London.

Biography
Boselli was born the first of four boys, he has three younger brothers.
Boselli was discovered at the age of six and began modelling for Armani Junior. He studied mechanical engineering at University College London, graduating with a first-class degree (BEng) in 2009 and a PhD in 2016.

Boselli is represented by British modelling agency Models 1. He has since been dubbed the "world’s sexiest maths teacher."  As of April 2020, his Instagram account has 2.7 million followers.

Modeling 
Boselli has been seen in American modeling campaigns for clothing retailer Abercrombie & Fitch and fitness club Equinox. He has also appeared in spreads for GQ Style and was featured on the cover of Attitude.

References

External links

1988 births
People from the Province of Verona
Italian male models
Living people
Alumni of University College London
Italian expatriates in the United Kingdom
21st-century Italian mathematicians
21st-century Italian engineers